Nurafshon is a district-level city and the administrative centre of Tashkent Region in Uzbekistan. It is also the seat of the Oʻrtachirchiq District, but not part of it.

Until 2017, the town was known as Toytepa. The towns Yangihayot and Chigirik are part of the city.

History
Two Zoroastrian period ossuaries, dating to the 6th century, are kept in the Samarkand museum.

Economy
Important cotton processing enterprises exist in Nurafshon, mostly due to Uzbek-South Korean joint ventures. Fluorspar, the most important source of fluorine, is mined at Nurafshon.

References

Populated places in Tashkent Region
Cities in Uzbekistan